Felix Leitner (born 31 December 1996) is an Austrian biathlete.

He debuted in the Biathlon World Cup on 3 December 2016 in Östersund, Sweden. He has won two gold medals at Biathlon Junior World Championships in 2016.

Biathlon results
All results are sourced from the International Biathlon Union.

World Championships
0 medals

*During Olympic seasons competitions are only held for those events not included in the Olympic program.
**The mixed relay was added as an event in 2005.
***The single mixed relay was added as an event in 2019.

World Cup

Podiums

References

1996 births
Living people
People from Hall in Tirol
Austrian male biathletes
Biathletes at the 2022 Winter Olympics
Olympic biathletes of Austria
Sportspeople from Tyrol (state)